Emmet County is a county located in the U.S. state of Iowa. As of the 2020 census, the population was 9,388. The county seat is Estherville.

History
Emmet County was created by authority of the Iowa Legislature in 1851. There were finally enough settlers in the area to organize the county in 1859. The county was named for the Irish patriot Robert Emmet, who was hanged as a traitor to the British government at the age of 25.

Geography
It is the second-smallest county by land area in Iowa, and the fourth-smallest by total area.

Major highways
 Iowa Highway 4
 Iowa Highway 9
 Iowa Highway 15

Adjacent counties
Jackson County, Minnesota  (northwest)
Martin County, Minnesota  (northeast)
Kossuth County  (east)
Palo Alto County  (south)
Dickinson County  (west)

Demographics

2020 census
There were 4,475 housing units of which 3,972 were occupied.

2010 census
There were 4,758 housing units, of which 4,236 were occupied.

2000 census

As of the census of 2000, there were 11,027 people, 4,450 households, and 2,910 families residing in the county.  The population density was 28 people per square mile (11/km2).  There were 4,889 housing units at an average density of 12 per square mile (5/km2).  The racial makeup of the county was 97.38% White, 0.24% Black or African American, 0.28% Native American, 0.30% Asian, 0.01% Pacific Islander, 1.25% from other races, and 0.54% from two or more races.  4.31% of the population were Hispanic or Latino of any race.

There were 4,450 households, out of which 27.90% had children under the age of 18 living with them, 55.00% were married couples living together, 7.80% had a female householder with no husband present, and 34.60% were non-families. 30.30% of all households were made up of individuals, and 15.30% had someone living alone who was 65 years of age or older.  The average household size was 2.36 and the average family size was 2.93.

In the county, the population was spread out, with 24.20% under the age of 18, 10.10% from 18 to 24, 23.80% from 25 to 44, 22.50% from 45 to 64, and 19.40% who were 65 years of age or older.  The median age was 40 years. For every 100 females there were 94.40 males.  For every 100 females age 18 and over, there were 93.30 males.

The median income for a household in the county was $33,305, and the median income for a family was $41,296. Males had a median income of $27,495 versus $20,278 for females. The per capita income for the county was $16,619.  About 5.20% of families and 8.20% of the population were below the poverty line, including 9.40% of those under age 18 and 9.10% of those age 65 or over.

Communities

Cities

Armstrong
Dolliver
Estherville
Gruver
Ringsted
Wallingford

Unincorporated communities

Forsyth
Gridley
Halfa
Hoprig
Huntington
Island Grove
Maple Hill
Raleigh

Townships
Emmet County is divided into twelve townships:

 Armstrong Grove
 Center
 Denmark
 Ellsworth
 Emmet
 Estherville
 High Lake
 Iowa Lake
 Jack Creek
 Lincoln
 Swan Lake
 Twelve Mile Lake

Population ranking
The population ranking of the following table is based on the 2020 census of Emmet County.
† county seat

Politics

See also

National Register of Historic Places listings in Emmet County, Iowa

References

Further reading
 History of Emmet County and Dickinson County, Iowa: A Record of Settlement, Organization, Progress and Achievement. In Two Volumes. Chicago: Pioneer Publishing Co., 1917.
 Volume 1 | Volume 2

External links

Emmet County, Iowa Unofficial county website

 
1851 establishments in Iowa
Populated places established in 1851